Enrique Líster Forján (21 April 1907 – 8 December 1994) was a Spanish communist politician and military officer.

Early life

Líster was born in 1907 at Ameneiro, A Coruña. A stonemason, he spent his adolescence in Cuba, before returning in 1925 and joining the Communist Party of Spain (PCE). His involvement with the revolutionary movement forced his exile until 1931, when the Second Spanish Republic was proclaimed. In August 1931, he took part in the Cuban uprising against Gerardo Machado, who had declared martial law. Between 1932 and 1935, Líster received training in the Frunze Military Academy, one of the most respected in the Soviet Union.

Spanish Civil War

In 1936, when the Spanish Civil War started, he joined the Fifth Regiment. The following year, as a high-ranking army officer, commanding the 11th division of the republican army, Líster was instrumental in the defense of Madrid and other important military actions. In October 1936 he led a mixed brigade in the ill-fated Republican counteroffensive at Seseña. As a divisional commander, he helped stall the Nationalist attack along the Jarama and played a significant role within the successful Republican counterattack at the Battle of Guadalajara.

Líster is widely regarded as a war hero for the Republican cause. His reputation as a competent military commander is largely based on his role as commander of the "11th Division", which was involved in some of the most important battles in Guadalajara, Brunete, Belchite and Teruel. Those brigades under his control rapidly became special battalions which took care of special operations. Some consider  examples of his high-level tactical command as the seizure of Brunete that helped to capture the nationalist general staff with almost no casualties for the republican army and his surprise action in Teruel that totally confused the nationalist army. Beevor, however, cites 4,300 casualties out of a strength of 13,353 at Brunete. Beevor quotes the chief Soviet advisor as reporting that Líster's division collapsed and 'lost its head and fled. We managed with great difficulty to bring it under control and prevent soldiers from fleeing their units. The toughest of repressive measures had to be applied. About 400 of those fleeing were shot on 24 July.' 
Later, he led the V Army Corps in the battle of the Ebro and in the Catalonia Offensive.

The "11ª División" did, however suffer a severe setback when it failed to capture Fuentes de Ebro in the Republican offensive in Aragon in August 1937.  The International Tank Regiment lost the majority of its tanks and this then led to mutual hatred between Lister and Juan Modesto, commander of the 5th Corps (which "11th Division" formed a part of) who held Lister responsible for the losses.

Exile

After the end of the Civil War, Líster took refuge in Moscow, later fighting in World War II as a Red Army general. He took part in the relief of Leningrad in January 1944. According to Christopher Andrew and Oleg Gordievsky, when in late 1959 Fidel Castro's intelligence chief Ramiro Valdés contacted the KGB in Mexico City, the Soviets sent over one hundred mostly Spanish-speaking advisors, including Enrique Líster, to organize the Committees for the Defense of the Revolution in Cuba.

Líster was also a general of the Yugoslav People's Army, giving him the rare distinction of having been a general in three different armies.

In 1973 he split from the PCE and founded the Spanish Communist Workers' Party (PCOE). A catalyst for the split was the condemnation by the PCE of the Soviet intervention in Czechoslovakia in 1968. Líster returned to Spain in 1977, after Francisco Franco's death, and rejoined the PCE during the Spanish transition to democracy. He died in 1994 in Madrid.

Works 

Líster wrote four books, two of them —Nuestra guerra (1966) and Memorias de un luchador (1977)— were about his personal experiences in the Spanish Civil War.
 Nuestra guerra (Our War) 1966 
 Memorias de un luchador (Memories of a Fighter) 1977 
 ¡Basta! (Enough!) 1970
 Así destruyó Carrillo el PCE (Thus Carrillo destroyed the PCE) 1982

See also
Antifascist Worker and Peasant Militias (MAOC)

Bibliography
Lister's stay in Cuba is mentioned in: 
Lister's qualities as a military leader are discussed in:

References

External links
Así destruyó Carrillo el PCE

1907 births
1994 deaths
People from Santiago (comarca)
Communist Party of Spain politicians
Spanish army officers
Spanish military personnel of the Spanish Civil War (Republican faction)
Exiles of the Spanish Civil War in the Soviet Union
Soviet generals
Soviet military personnel of World War II
Generals of the Yugoslav People's Army
International Lenin School alumni
People granted political asylum in the Soviet Union
Spanish military personnel of World War II